John Alexander Hellard (20 March 1882 – 2 July 1916) played first-class cricket for Somerset in 1907 and 1910. He was born at Stogumber, Somerset and died in the First World War fighting on the Somme at Beaumont Hamel, France.

Educated at The King's School, Canterbury, Hellard was a right-handed lower-order batsman and a right-arm fast-medium bowler, although he did not bowl in first-class cricket. He played in two matches, both against Worcestershire, one in 1907 at Bath, the other in 1910 at Worcester. His highest first-class score was 15 in the 1907 game.

A second lieutenant in the Somerset Light Infantry during the First World War, he was killed on the second day of the Battle of the Somme in 1916 and is commemorated at the Serre Road cemetery.

References

1882 births
1916 deaths
English cricketers
Somerset cricketers
British military personnel killed in the Battle of the Somme
British Army personnel of World War I
Somerset Light Infantry officers
Military personnel from Somerset
People educated at The King's School, Canterbury